Brandhall is a suburb of Oldbury in the south of the Metropolitan Borough of Sandwell, West Midlands, bordering Birmingham and Halesowen. The development of the area commenced during the 1930s with the construction of several hundred private houses along the Hagley Road and Wolverhampton Road, as well as several side roads leading off the main dual carriageways. However, most of Brandhall was developed in the 1950s and 1960s, when several thousand council houses, flats and bungalows were built by Oldbury Council. Most of the high and medium-rise flats in Brandhall were demolished in the early 2000s and in their place housing associations built new low-rise homes. Brandhall is growing to be a more popular place due to the construction of new facilities, such as a local supermarket and a doctor's surgery.

Brandhall (along with the rest of the Oldbury borough, and the neighbouring boroughs of Smethwick and Rowley Regis) became part of the County Borough of Warley in 1966, but this arrangement lasted just eight years until Warley merged with West Bromwich to form Sandwell Metropolitan Borough in 1974.

Brandhall is home to secondary school, Perryfields Academy and two primary schools, Perryfields Primary School and Brandhall Primary School.

Nearest places
Quinton
Warley
Hurst Green
Bearwood
Halesowen

Areas of Sandwell
Oldbury, West Midlands